Mancholy is a settlement in the northwestern part of the island of Santiago, Cape Verde. It is part of the municipality of Santa Catarina. In 2010 its population was 903. It is situated 4 km northwest of Assomada, on the road to Tarrafal (EN1-ST01).

References

Villages and settlements in Santiago, Cape Verde
Santa Catarina, Cape Verde